Real Ariquemes Esporte Clube, commonly referred to as Real Ariquemes, is a Brazilian football club based in Ariquemes, Rondônia. The club competes in the Série D, the fourth tier of the Brazilian football league system, as well as in the Campeonato Rondoniense, the top division in the Rondônia state football league system.

As of 2022, Real Ariquemes is the top-ranked team from Rondônia in CBF's national club ranking, being placed 119th overall.

Stadium
Rondoniense play their home games at Valerião. The stadium has a maximum capacity of 5,000 people.

Honours
 Campeonato Rondoniense
 Winners (3): 2017, 2018, 2022

References

External links
 Official Site
 Real Ariquemes on Globo Esporte

Association football clubs established in 2011
Real Ariquemes
2011 establishments in Brazil